In electronics, the Gummel plot is the combined plot of the base and collector electric currents,  and , of a bipolar transistor vs. the base–emitter voltage, on a semi-logarithmic scale. This plot is very useful in device characterization because it reflects on the quality of the emitter–base junction while the base–collector bias, is kept constant.

A number of other device parameters can be garnered either quantitatively or qualitatively directly from the Gummel plot:
 The common-emitter current gain, and the common-base current gain,
 Base and collector ideality factors,
 Series resistances and leakage currents.
Sometimes the DC current gain, is plotted on the same figure as well.

See also
 Hermann Gummel
 Bipolar junction transistor
 Gummel–Poon model

References

Transistors
Plots (graphics)